The economy of Montreal is the second largest of all cities in Canada and the first in Quebec. Montreal is a centre of commerce, industry, technology, culture, finance, and world affairs. In 2015, Metropolitan Montreal was responsible for $193 Billion CDN of Quebec's $370 Billion CDN GDP.

History 
Montreal became an important centre of trade early in its history and surpassed Quebec City in importance even before their populations became comparable. When Canada became part of the British Empire in 1763, it was already the centre of the North American Fur Trade. Over the course of the 19th century Montreal grew to become the economic centre of Canada as well as its most populous city.

Montreal and Toronto 
Between the end of World War II and 1971, both Montreal and Toronto grew enormously in size. Between 1941 and 1951, Montreal's population grew by 20% and Toronto's by 25%. Between 1951 and 1961, Montreal grew by 35% and Toronto 45%. And from 1961 to 1971, Montreal grew by a little less than 20% and Toronto 30%. In the early 1970s, 30 years after Toronto had begun challenging Montreal as the economic capital of Canada, Toronto surpassed Montreal in size. Indeed, the volume of stocks traded at the Toronto Stock Exchange surpassed that traded at the Montreal Stock Exchange in the 1940s.

Recovery 
During the 1980s and early 1990s, Montreal experienced a slower rate of economic growth than many other major Canadian cities. By the late 1990s, however, Montreal's economic climate had improved, as new firms and institutions began to fill the traditional business and financial niches. As the city celebrated its 350th anniversary in 1992, construction began on its two newest and largest skyscrapers: 1000 de La Gauchetière and 1250 René-Lévesque. Montreal's improving economic conditions allowed further enhancements of the city infrastructure, with the expansion of the metro system, construction of new skyscrapers and the development of new highways including the start of a ring road around the island. The city also attracted several international organizations towards moving their secretariats into Montreal's Quartier International.

Industries 

Montreal industries include aerospace, electronic goods, pharmaceuticals, printed goods, software engineering, telecommunications, textile and apparel manufacturing, tobacco, tourism and transportation. The service sector is also strong and includes civil, mechanical and process engineering, finance, higher education, and research and development. In 2002, Montreal ranked as the 4th largest center in North America in terms of aerospace jobs.

Port of Montreal 
The Port of Montreal is the largest inland port in the world, handling 26 million tonnes of cargo annually. As one of the most important ports in Canada, it remains a trans-shipment point for grain, sugar, petroleum products, machinery, and consumer goods. For this reason, Montreal is the railway hub of Canada and has always been an extremely important rail city; it is home to the headquarters of the Canadian National Railway, and was home to the headquarters of the Canadian Pacific Railway until 1995.

Artificial Intelligence 
Montreal is a global hub for artificial intelligence research with many companies involved in this sector, such as Facebook AI Research (FAIR), Microsoft Research, Google Brain, DeepMind, Samsung Research, and Thales Group.(cortAIx). A notable Montreal AI start-up is Element AI. Element AI is co-founded by Université de Montréal professor Yoshua Bengio, who won the Turing Award in 2018 for his contributions to deep learning.

Growing alongside Montreal's AI industry is a cloud computing sector which takes advantage of the city's IT talent pool, lower electricity rates, and proximity to the US. Google opened a cloud data center in Montreal in 2017, its first in Canada, following the steps of Amazon, IBM, and Bell. Locally headquartered, middle-market cloud computing businesses also flourish in Montreal—like Ormuco Inc., a former cloud managed service provider which now also develops platforms for 5G mobile app development, reflecting a wider regional industry shift towards edge computing.

Video Games 

The video game industry is also growing rapidly in Montreal since 1997, coinciding with the opening of Ubisoft Montreal. Recently, the city has attracted world leading game developers and publishers studios such as Ubisoft, EA, Eidos Interactive, Artificial Mind and Movement, BioWare, and Strategy First, mainly because video games jobs have been heavily subsidized by the provincial government. Every year, this industry generates billions of dollars and thousands of jobs in the Montreal area.

Arts and Culture 
Montreal is also a centre of film and television production. Five studios of the Academy Award-winning documentary producer National Film Board of Canada can be found here, as well as the head offices of Telefilm Canada, the national feature-length film and television funding agency. Given its eclectic architecture and broad availability of film services and crew members, Montreal is a popular filming location for feature-length films, and sometimes stands in for European locations. The city is also home to many recognized cultural, film and music festivals (Just For Laughs, Montreal Jazz Festival, and others), which contribute significantly to its economy. It is also home to one of the world's largest cultural enterprises, the Cirque du Soleil.

In 2006 Montreal was named a UNESCO City of Design, only one of three design capitals of the world (with the others being Berlin and Buenos Aires). This distinguished title recognizes Montreal's design community. Since 2005 the city has also been home for the International Council of Graphic Design Associations (Icograda), and the International Design Alliance (IDA).

The cultural sector is responsible for 6% of Montreal's GDP and 4.1% of all jobs in Montreal. In 2013, the cultural sector provided 82,740 direct jobs and 48,199 indirect jobs, for a total of 130,949 jobs. The cultural sector was estimated at 10.7 billion dollars in 2013.

Organizational and Corporate Headquarters 
The headquarters of the Canadian Space Agency are located in Longueuil, directly east of Montreal across the Saint Lawrence River. Montreal also hosts the headquarters of the International Civil Aviation Organization (ICAO, a United Nations body); the World Anti-Doping Agency (an Olympic body); the International Air Transport Association (IATA); and the International Gay and Lesbian Chamber of Commerce (IGLCC), as well as some 60 other international organizations in various fields (See below).

Several companies are headquartered in Greater Montreal including:

Passenger Transport, loyalty programs, and tour operators
 Air Canada - Airline (Canada's largest)
 Air Transat - Airline
 Air Inuit
 Via Rail
 Aimia (company)
 Transat A.T.

Retail and restaurants
 Aldo Group
 Alimentation Couche-Tard - Convenience store operator (Largest in Canada)
 Birks Group
 Dollarama
 Metro Inc.
 MTY Food Group
 Reitmans
 Structube

Finance
 Bank of Montreal (legal head office, operational headquarters in Toronto)
 Desjardins Group (operational headquarters, legal head office is in Levis, Quebec)
 Laurentian Bank
 National Bank of Canada
 Power Corporation
 Royal Bank Of Canada (legal head office, operational headquarters in Toronto)

Utilities and media
 Bell Canada (Telecommunications and Media) - Global HQ
 Hydro-Québec
 Quebecor

E-commerce and Information Technology
 Beyond the Rack - E-Commerce, Flash Sales
 CGI Group (Information technology) - Global HQ
 Lightspeed - Point of sale software, E-Commerce  
 Nuvei - Payments infrastructure software, E-Commerce

Aerospace
 Bombardier Inc. (Aircraft manufacturing, mass transportation equipment manufacturing and financial services provider) - Global HQ
 CAE
 Pratt and Whitney Canada

Freight transport
 Canada Steamship Lines
 Canadian National Railway
 TFI International

Sporting equipment and toys
 CCM (bicycle company)
 CCM (ice hockey)
 MEGA Brands

Arts
 CinéGroupe
 Cirque du Soleil
 Toon Boom Animation

Food and beverage
 Molson
 Saputo

Engineering firms
 SNC-Lavalin,
 WSP Global

Natural resources
 Domtar
 Kruger Inc.
 Resolute Forest Products
 Rio Tinto Alcan
 Targray - Supplier of materials and consumables for the international Solar, Energy Storage, and Biofuels industries.
 Tembec

Pharmaceuticals and personal care
 Bausch Health
 L'Oreal Canada
 Merck Canada Inc.
 Novartis Canada
 Pfizer Canada
 Pharmascience

See also 

Board of Trade of Metropolitan Montreal

References